The Men's large hill individual ski jumping competition for the 2010 Winter Olympics in Vancouver, Canada was held at Whistler Olympic Park in Whistler, British Columbia. It started on 19 February and ended on 20 February. Austria's Thomas Morgenstern was the defending Olympic champion in this event. Andreas Küttel of Switzerland was the defending world champion in this event. Two test events took place at the Olympic venue on 24–25 January 2009, both won by Austria's Gregor Schlierenzauer. The last World Cup event in this format prior to the 2010 Games took place on 6 February 2010 in Willingen, Germany and was won by Schlierenzauer.

Results

Qualifying 
A qualifying round for this event took place on 19 February with a trial qualification at 08:30 PST and a qualification round at 10:00 PST the same day.

Final 
The final took place on 20 February. Consisting of two jumps, the top thirty jumpers after the first jump qualify for the second jump. The combined total of the two jumps was used to determine the final ranking. A practice round for competition took place at 08:30 PST with the first and second rounds of the event taking place at 11:30 PST and 12:30 PST, respectively.

Defending Olympic champion Morgenstern finished fifth, test event winner Schlierenzauer earned bronze, and defending world champion Küttel finished a disappointing 24th. Ammann's first jump was the longest in Olympic history though it was eclipsed by Schlierenzauer in the team event two days later.

References

External links 
 2010 Winter Olympics results: LH Individual, from http://www.vancouver2010.com/; retrieved 2010-02-19.

Ski jumping at the 2010 Winter Olympics